Tasmap is the main government authority for the state of Tasmania in Australia for the mapping and management of land information systems for the state.

In earlier decades most Australian mapping departments were known by the common name of the Lands and Surveys departments, however marketing and other factors have simplified the names of such departments.  The current Tasmanian government department umbrella for the Tasmap operations is the Department of Primary Industries, Parks, Water and Environment.

The range of products from the authority include:
 Cadastral/Topographic maps in the 1:25000 scale
 Topographic maps in 1:250,000 and  1:100,000
 Digital mapping products

As well as a range of atlases and maps serving various purposes, it provides a series of national park maps.

See also
 Geoscience Australia

External links
 Tasmap: about us - Includes useful section "Brief history of map making in Tasmania"

References

Map series of Australia
Maps of Tasmania